Caihuying station is a subway station on Line 14 of the Beijing Subway. The station opened on December 31, 2021.

Platform Layout
The station has an underground island platform.

Exits
There are 2 exits, lettered A and B. Exit B is accessible via an elevator.

References

Beijing Subway stations in Fengtai District
Railway stations in China opened in 2021